Noor Alam Khan (Pashto/) is a Pakistani politician who has been a member of the National Assembly of Pakistan since August 2018. Previously, he was a member of the National Assembly from 2008 to 2013. He was a member of the Pakistan Tehreek-e-Insaf (PTI) from 2018 to 2022 and the Pakistan Peoples Party (PPP) from 2008 to 2018.

He was one of the 14 dissident members of the ruling PTI who were given show-cause notices by the PTI for allying with the opposition before the no-confidence motion against Imran Khan.

Political career
He was elected to the National Assembly of Pakistan from Constituency NA-3 (Peshawar-III) as a candidate of the Pakistan Peoples Party (PPP) in the 2008 Pakistani general election. He received 27,038 votes and defeated Muhammad Hasham Babar of the Awami National Party (ANP). During the tenure, he served as the federal parliamentary secretary for commerce.

In 2012, he was named the richest known member of the National Assembly of Pakistan, with his declared assets being more than PKR 32 billion. He owned 200 acres of prime land (for PKR 160 million per acre) in Peshawar, gold ornaments worth PKR 11.6 million, two vehicles, and a house.

He contested the 2013 Pakistani general election from NA-3 (Peshawar-III) as a candidate of the Pakistan Peoples Party (PPP) but stood fourth by obtaining 22,045 votes.

He was re-elected to the National Assembly as a candidate of the Pakistan Tehreek-e-Insaf (PTI) from Constituency NA-27 (Peshawar-I) in the 2018 Pakistani general election. He received 71,158 votes and defeated Haji Ghulam Ali of the Muttahida Majlis-e-Amal (MMA). He was one of several dissident members of the ruling PTI who had said they would vote against their party's chairman, prime minister Imran Khan, in the no-confidence motion against him. However, they did not have to vote at the end as the opposition alliance, the Pakistan Democratic Movement (PDM), managed to gather enough votes by itself to oust prime minister Imran Khan on 10 April 2022.

References

Living people
Pakistani MNAs 2008–2013
Pakistan People's Party politicians
Pakistani MNAs 2018–2023
Pakistan Tehreek-e-Insaf MNAs
Year of birth missing (living people)